Bianca Blair Crawford (born Bianca Nicole Blair; April 9, 1989) is an American professional wrestler and fitness and figure competitor. She is signed to WWE, where she performs on the Raw brand under the ring name Bianca Belair, and is the current Raw Women's Champion in her first reign.

A former track and field athlete, Belair made her professional wrestling debut in 2016 for WWE's developmental territory NXT, competing for the NXT Women's Championship on multiple occasions. After being drafted to SmackDown, she won the 2021 Women's Royal Rumble match, becoming the second African American after The Rock to win a Royal Rumble match. She successfully challenged for the SmackDown Women's Championship against Sasha Banks at WrestleMania 37, which marked the second time women main-evented WrestleMania, as well as the first time two African Americans main-evented WWE's flagship event. In 2021, she was ranked No. 1 of the top 150 female wrestlers by Pro Wrestling Illustrated (PWI). On October 19, 2022, she reached 200 days as Raw Women's Champion, becoming the longest-reigning black world champion (male or female) in WWE history. On March 15, 2023, she reached 344 days as Raw Women's Champion, making her the longest-reigning black singles champion in WWE history, surpassing MVP's 343 days as United States Champion.

Early life 
Blair attended Austin-East Magnet High School in Knoxville, Tennessee, where she succeeded in many sports such as track. She was a track and field athlete who competed in the hurdles and had what ESPN writer Sean Hurd called "a volatile six-year track career" that saw her attend three universities. She first attended the University of South Carolina and then Texas A&M University, and later did not compete for a year, before completing her college career at the University of Tennessee, where she became All-SEC and All-American as well as being named to the SEC's academic honor roll in 2011 and 2012. Blair was also a CrossFit competitor and powerlifter, having appeared in RX magazine, Femme Rouge magazine, and CrossFit.com. Blair was forced to abandon her CrossFit career due to intercostal chondritis, also known as shifting rib syndrome.

Professional wrestling career

WWE

NXT (2016–2020) 

Blair entered her information into the WWE prospects database shortly after the premature end of her CrossFit career "more on a whim than with an actual plan", according to Hurd. Less than two weeks later, while working phone sales at a flavoring company in Atlanta, she received a social media message from 20-year WWE veteran Mark Henry, who had come across Blair's profile on the CrossFit circuit, saying he could get her a tryout, but emphasized she had to do the work.

After two official tryouts, Blair signed a contract with WWE on April 12, 2016, and was assigned to the WWE Performance Center in Orlando, Florida. Blair made her first appearance during an in–ring segment at an NXT live event on June 25 as "Binky Blair", where she proclaimed to be the "EST of NXT... prettiest, baddest, strongest." She made her in–ring debut on September 29, losing to Aliyah. On the May 3, 2017, episode of NXT, Blair made her television debut under the ring name Bianca Belair, taking part in a battle royal to determine the number one contender for the NXT Women's Championship, but was eliminated by Billie Kay and Peyton Royce. Belair participated in the Mae Young Classic, defeating Sage Beckett in the first round, but was eliminated in the second round by the eventual tournament winner Kairi Sane.

In January 2018, Belair began an undefeated streak by defeating various competitors including Lacey Evans, Candice LeRae, Dakota Kai and Deonna Purrazzo. On April 8, Belair made her WrestleMania debut by participating in the WrestleMania Women's Battle Royal at WrestleMania 34, but was eliminated by Becky Lynch. On January 26, 2019, at TakeOver: Phoenix, Belair unsuccessfully challenged Shayna Baszler for the NXT Women's Championship after interference from Jessamyn Duke and Marina Shafir, ending her undefeated streak at 367 days. At TakeOver: New York on April 5, Belair failed to win the title as she was submitted by Baszler in a fatal four-way match also involving Kairi Sane and Io Shirai. On the May 29 episode of NXT, Belair suffered her first pinfall loss in NXT to Mia Yim. A triple threat match between Belair, Yim, and Shirai to determine the #1 contender for the NXT Women's Championship was announced on the September 4 episode of NXT. LeRae was added the next week to make it a fatal 4-way match. The match would be the first match on the debut episode of NXT on the USA Network, which LeRae won.

On the October 23 episode of NXT, Belair lost to Rhea Ripley despite outside interference from Shirai and LeRae. At WarGames on November 23, Belair and Team Baszler (NXT Women's Champion Shayna Baszler, Io Shirai, and NXT UK Women's Champion Kay Lee Ray) lost to Team Ripley (Rhea Ripley, Candice LeRae, Dakota Kai, and Tegan Nox) in the first ever women's WarGames match. The following night, she participated at Survivor Series, where the three brands (Raw, SmackDown and NXT) faced each other in several matches; she was part of Team NXT, who defeated Team Raw and Team SmackDown in a 5-on-5-on-5 women's elimination match. On January 26, 2020, at Royal Rumble, Belair entered her first women's Royal Rumble match at #2, eliminating a record 8 other superstars (tied with Baszler), before she was eliminated by eventual winner Charlotte Flair after lasting 33 minutes and 20 seconds. At TakeOver: Portland on February 16, Belair faced Ripley for the NXT Women's Championship in a losing effort. On the February 19 episode of NXT, she competed in her final match in NXT, losing to Flair.

SmackDown Women's Champion (2020–2021) 
On the Raw following WrestleMania 36, Belair made her main roster debut as a face by saving The Street Profits (Angelo Dawkins and her husband Montez Ford) from Zelina Vega, Angel Garza, and Austin Theory, establishing herself as a member of the Raw roster. As part of the 2020 Draft, Belair was drafted to the SmackDown brand. On the October 30 episode of SmackDown, she defeated Billie Kay and Natalya in a triple threat match to qualify for Team SmackDown at Survivor Series on November 22, but was eliminated by countout and her team lost the match to Team Raw. 

On January 31, 2021, at Royal Rumble, Belair won the Royal Rumble match by last eliminating Rhea Ripley, becoming the second-ever Black superstar to achieve this feat in WWE history after The Rock. She was in the match for over 56 minutes, a record for a participant in the Women's Royal Rumble match, having entered at #3. At Elimination Chamber on February 21, she and SmackDown Women's Champion Sasha Banks failed to win the WWE Women's Tag Team Championship from Shayna Baszler and Nia Jax. On the following episode of SmackDown, Belair officially challenged Banks to a title match at WrestleMania 37. They also failed to win the tag team titles on March 21 at Fastlane. On the first night of WrestleMania on April 10, Belair defeated Banks in the main event to win the SmackDown Women's Championship, marking her first title in her career. She then retained the title against Bayley at WrestleMania Backlash on May 16, and at Hell in a Cell on June 20, inside the namesake structure. Belair was scheduled to defend the title against Bayley in an "I Quit" match at Money in the Bank on July 18, but the match was cancelled due to Bayley suffering a torn ACL while training at the WWE Performance Center. 

At SummerSlam on August 21, Belair was scheduled to defend her title against Sasha Banks, but during the event, it was announced that Banks could not compete. She was seemingly replaced by Carmella, who was attacked by a returning Becky Lynch, who challenged Belair for the title. Belair accepted and lost the title in 26 seconds after two moves by Lynch, ending her reign at 133 days. She described the loss as one of the lowest points of her career, "losing the title [in] 26 seconds in front of all of your fans." At Extreme Rules on September 26, Belair defeated Lynch by disqualification due to interference by a returning Sasha Banks, thus not earning the title. As part of the 2021 Draft, Belair was drafted to the Raw brand. At Crown Jewel on October 21, Belair failed to regain the title in a triple threat match against Lynch and Banks. On the November 1 episode of Raw, she was unable to capture the Raw Women's Championship from Lynch. At Survivor Series on November 21, Belair made history by becoming the first person to overcome a four-on-one handicap to win the event's traditional five-on-five elimination match.

Raw Women's Champion (2022–present) 
On January 29, 2022, at Royal Rumble, Belair entered at #8, lasting 47 minutes before she was eliminated by Charlotte Flair. At Elimination Chamber on February 19, Belair won the Elimination Chamber match to become the #1 contender for the Raw Women's Championship at WrestleMania 38, thus reigniting her feud with Lynch. The rivalry between the two heightened and on the March 28 episode of Raw, Lynch appeared and attempted to cut Belair's hair with a pair of scissors in revenge for being scarred from a ponytail whip from Belair, however, she attacked Lynch with a Kiss of Death and chopped off her hair instead. On the first night of WrestleMania 38 on April 2, Belair defeated Lynch to win the Raw Women's Championship.

Belair retained her title against WWE official Sonya Deville on the April 25 episode of Raw, despite interference from Carmella and Queen Zelina. Belair then retained the title against Asuka and Lynch in a triple threat match at Hell in a Cell on June 5, and against Carmella on July 2 at Money in the Bank. On the July 11 episode of Raw, Belair lost a rematch by countout due to interference from Lynch but retained the title, until defeating Carmella in another rematch the following week. At SummerSlam on July 30, Belair retained the title against Lynch, and after the match, they would embrace each other, ending their feud. However, they were confronted by the returning Bayley and her new allies Dakota Kai and Iyo Sky, reigniting their feud. On the August 8 episode of Raw, they challenged Belair, Alexa Bliss, and Asuka to a six-woman tag team match at Clash at the Castle, which they accepted. At the event on September 3, they lost to Damage CTRL when Bayley pinned her. At Extreme Rules on October 8, Belair retained the Raw Women's Championship against Bayley in a ladder match. On October 19, Belair reached 200 days as champion, making her the longest-reigning African American world champion in WWE history, male or female. At Crown Jewel on November 5, Belair retained the title against Bayley in a Last Woman Standing match. Three weeks later at Survivor Series WarGames on November 26, Belair, Asuka, Bliss, Lynch, and Mia Yim defeated Damage CTRL (Bayley, Kai, Sky), Nikki Cross and Rhea Ripley in a WarGames match after Lynch pinned Kai. 

On the January 2, 2023 episode of Raw, Belair retained the title against Bliss by disqualification after Bliss attacked Belair and the referee. A rematch between the two was later scheduled for the Royal Rumble on January 28, where Belair retained the title against Bliss.

Professional wrestling style and persona 
Belair wrestles in a powerhouse style and is noted for her strength. She uses the nickname "The EST of WWE" (or NXT during her time there), which she describes as being "the fastest, the strongest, the quickest, the roughest and the toughest – emphasis on the "est". She uses a torture rack into an argentine facebuster as her finisher, which she calls the K.O.D (Kiss Of Death). Belair is known for her signature ponytail, which she often uses against her opponents as a weapon. She has also been known for making her own ring gear.

Other media 
Belair made her video game debut as a playable character in WWE 2K19. She is also featured in WWE 2K20, WWE 2K22 and WWE 2K23. In late January 2020, WWE.com revealed Belair's first action figure debuting in Mattel's Basic Series 107.

On August 25, 2022, Blair signed with Hollywood agency WME. On December 4, Blair revealed that she would make her fitness and figure competition debut for World Beauty Fitness & Fashion (WBFF) at the Atlantic City ProAm. Two days later, Blair confirmed that she won the first place at Wellness, second place at Fitness, while also receiving a WBFF pro card.

Personal life 
Blair's father was in a band called the Blair Brothers, and her brother played football. Her grandfather Edward G. High was a professor and chairman of biochemistry at Meharry Medical College, her great-grandfather Edward N. Toole was the first licensed African American electrician in Durham, North Carolina, and her aunt Miranda Hunt was one of the first black people to integrate St. Cecilia High School in Nashville, Tennessee.

On June 9, 2017, Blair announced that she was engaged to fellow professional wrestler Kenneth Crawford, better known as Montez Ford. The couple married on June 23, 2018. Blair is the stepmother to Crawford's two children from a previous relationship. Blair has been open about her struggles with disordered eating, crediting a past track coach at Texas A&M University with helping her to prioritize her mental health and move onto recovery from the disorder.

Championships and accomplishments

Fitness and figure competition 
 World Beauty Fitness & Fashion
 1st place (Wellness Class; 2022)
 2nd place (Fitness Class; 2022)

Professional wrestling 

 ESPN
 Female wrestler of the year (2022)
 ESPY Awards
 Best WWE Moment (2021) 
 New York Post
 Female Wrestler of the Year (2022)
 Pro Wrestling Illustrated
Woman of the Year (2022)
 Ranked No. 1 of the top 150 female wrestlers in the PWI Women's 150 in 2021
 Slam Wrestling Awards
 Best WWE Female (2022)
 Sports Illustrated
 Ranked No. 9 in the top 10 women's wrestlers in 2018
 Ranked No. 3 in the top 10 wrestlers in 2021 and 2022
 TJR Wrestling
 Best Female Wrestler (2022) 
 Wrestling Inc.
 Finisher of the Year (2022) - KOD 
 WWE
 WWE Raw Women's Championship (1 time, current)
 WWE SmackDown Women's Championship (1 time)
 Women's Royal Rumble (2021)
 Bumpy Award (1 time)
 Best Match of the Half-Year (2021) –

References

External links 

 
 
 
 

1989 births
Living people
African-American female professional wrestlers
American female professional wrestlers
Fitness and figure competitors
South Carolina Gamecocks women's track and field athletes
Texas A&M Aggies women's track and field athletes
Tennessee Volunteers women's track and field athletes
CrossFit athletes
Sportspeople from Knoxville, Tennessee
21st-century African-American sportspeople
Professional wrestlers from Tennessee
21st-century African-American women
20th-century African-American people
20th-century African-American women
21st-century professional wrestlers
WWE Raw Women's Champions